The men's 4×200 metre freestyle relay was a swimming event held as part of the swimming at the 1932 Summer Olympics programme. It was the sixth appearance of the event, which was established in 1908. The competition was held on Tuesday, August 9, 1932.

Twenty-eight swimmers from seven nations competed.

Medalists

Records
These were the standing world and Olympic records (in minutes) prior to the 1932 Summer Olympics.

Japan set a new world record with 8:58.4 minutes. They bettered the standing world record by more than 35 seconds and broke the nine-minute barrier.

Results

As there were only seven nation who competed in this event only a final was held.

Final

References

External links
Olympic Report
 

Swimming at the 1932 Summer Olympics
4 × 200 metre freestyle relay
Men's events at the 1932 Summer Olympics